I Forget Where We Were  is the second album by British singer-songwriter Ben Howard, released on 20 October 2014.

Critical reception
The album was met with positive reviews from music critics. On Metacritic, which assigns a rating out of 100, the album was scored a 77, which indicates generally favourable reviews. MusicOHM.com's Graeme Marsh gave the album 4 and a half stars, saying "I Forget Where We Were is an album to grow into rather than one of instant satisfaction, one that blossoms upon every subsequent listen, one to clutch close to your heart and cherish forever." Henry Boon of DIY Magazine gave the album 4 stars, saying "...for those who didn’t care for Every Kingdom, it may also be easy to write off I Forget Where We Were as just another lame indie-folk album. On closer inspection however, it actually forgoes both attitudes; this album is more complex, more imaginative and technically worlds away from Every Kingdom." He explains, "The crowning glory lays with the lead single 'End of the Affair', an eight minute perfectly subtle build of complex classical guitar and strained emotive vocals." In a 3-and-a-half star review, Stephen Thomas Erlewine of AllMusic says that "Howard expects you to meet him on his own terms and provides just enough aural enticement to give him not just one listen but a second, which is when I Forget Where We Were really begins to sink in its hooks."

In a more mixed review, Molloy Woodcraft of The Observer says that "Individual tracks take their time to get going (only one song here comes in under four minutes) and numbers such as opener 'Small Things' break after two or three minutes to build back up from a pleasant plod to a sustained fug of sound", but comments that "the title track is a winner but it’s with 'In Dreams', and its fast folky picking, that the record really takes off... [and] the near eight-minute 'End of the Affair' aims to give John Martyn’s Rather Be the Devil a run for its money". The Rolling Stones' Hilary Hughes comments that "As mild as the music might often sound, this is an album that cuts deep."

Accolades

Track listing
All tracks are written by Ben Howard.

Charts and certifications

Weekly charts

Year-end charts

Certifications

References

2014 albums
Ben Howard albums
Island Records albums